Blagovest satellites (technical identifier 14F149) form a constellation of four geostationary satellites to support Russian Armed Forces communications.

The satellites have Ka and Q band transponders, and provide high speed internet, telephony, and other services. They were manufactured by ISS Reshetnev, and are based on the Ekspress-2000 bus featuring two deployable solar arrays with five panels on each. The design life is 15 years.

The first satellite Kosmos 2520/Blagovest-11L was launched on 16 August 2017, Kosmos 2526/Blagovest 12L on 18 April 2018,  Kosmos 2533/Blagovest 13L on 21 December 2018, with the fourth (Kosmos 2539/Blagovest-14L) launched on 5 August 2019, using a Proton-M carrier rocket with Briz-M orbital insertion module. All launches took place from the Baikonur Cosmodrome Site 81 Pad 24.

References

Communications satellites of Russia
Kosmos satellites
Satellites of Russia